Brachinus patruelis is a species of ground beetle in the Brachininae subfamily that is endemic to Massachusetts, United States. The species is black coloured with orange head and legs.

References

External links
Brachinus patruelis on Bug Guide

Beetles described in 1949
Endemic fauna of the United States
Beetles of North America
Brachininae